Coulter Woodmansey (born August 1, 1997) is a professional Canadian football offensive lineman for the Hamilton Tiger-Cats of the Canadian Football League (CFL).

University career
Woodmansey played U Sports football for the Guelph Gryphons from 2016 to 2019, where he appeared in 32 regular season games, including 28 starts at guard, over the course of four seasons.

Professional career
Woodmansey was selected fifth overall in the 2020 CFL Draft by the Hamilton Tiger-Cats, but did not play in 2020 due to the cancellation of the 2020 CFL season. He then signed with the team on January 21, 2021. Woodmansey made the team's active roster following training camp in 2021 and played in his first career professional game on August 5, 2021, against the Winnipeg Blue Bombers. He earned his first career start on October 2, 2021, against the Montreal Alouettes.

References

External links
Hamilton Tiger-Cats bio

1997 births
Living people
Canadian football offensive linemen
Guelph Gryphons football players
Hamilton Tiger-Cats players
Players of Canadian football from Ontario
Canadian football people from Toronto